is a railway station which straddles Tokyo's Chiyoda and Bunkyō wards, operated jointly by East Japan Railway Company (JR East) and Tokyo Metropolitan Bureau of Transportation (Toei).

Lines
Suidōbashi Station is served by the following lines:
 East Japan Railway Company
 Chūō-Sōbu Line

 Toei Mita Line

Station layout
Suidōbashi Station is divided into two parts: the JR East station and the Toei Subway station. There is no direct passage between the JR and Toei platforms.

JR East

The JR East part of the station is located on an elevated viaduct and has two side platforms serving two Chūō-Sōbu Line tracks, with platform 1 being used by westbound trains and platform 2 being used by eastbound trains. South of the platforms there are an extra two tracks for Chūō Line (Rapid) trains, which bypass the station non-stop. There are two exits from the station; the east exit is the busier of the two and features amenities such as a staffed "Midori no Madoguchi" ticket office, ticket vending machines, lockers, and toilets. The west exit has all of these amenities except the ticket office.

Platforms

Toei

The Toei Subway station has one island platform serving two tracks.

Platforms

History
What is now the JR East station first opened on 24 October 1906. The Toei Subway station opened on 30 June 1972.

Passenger statistics
In fiscal 2013, the JR East station was used by an average of 85,320 passengers daily (boarding passengers only), making it the 49th-busiest station operated by JR East. In fiscal 2013, the Toei station was used by an average of 21,903 passengers daily (boarding passengers only). The daily average passenger figures (boarding passengers only) for JR East in previous years are as shown below.

Surrounding area
 Nihon University
 Surugadai University Ochanomizu Campus
 Senshu University Kanda Campus
 Chuo University Korakuen Campus
 Toyo Gakuen University Hongo Campus
 Tokyo University of Career Development Chiyoda Campus
 Tokyo Dental College Suidobashi Clinic
 Tokyo Dome City
 Kanda River

See also

 List of railway stations in Japan

References

External links

 Suidōbashi Station information (JR East) 
 Suidobashi Station information (Toei) 

Railway stations in Japan opened in 1906
Railway stations in Japan opened in 1972
Chūō-Sōbu Line
Toei Mita Line
Stations of East Japan Railway Company
Stations of Tokyo Metropolitan Bureau of Transportation
Railway stations in Tokyo